Teck-Hua Ho is a Tan Chin Tuan Centennial Professor at the National University of Singapore (NUS). He is also the senior deputy president and provost at NUS. Prior to joining NUS, he was the William Halford Jr. Family Professor of Marketing at the Haas School of Business (University of California, Berkeley).  He is also the executive chairman of AI Singapore, a national research and development programme.

Education 
Ho obtained a bachelor's degree with first class honours in electrical engineering in 1985 and a master's degree in computer and information sciences in 1989 from NUS. He then obtained a master's degree in 1991 and a PhD in 1993 in decision sciences from the Wharton School of the University of Pennsylvania.

Career 
Prior to becoming senior deputy president and provost, Ho was deputy president of research and technology (2015-2017) and vice president of research strategy (2011-2012) at NUS. He is also a professor of economics and marketing at the NUS Business School and director of the NUS Centre for Behavioural Economics.

From 2002 to 2015, Ho was a professor at the Haas School of Business. At the School, he was the William Halford Jr. Family Chair in Marketing and director of the Asia Business Center. He was also associate dean of academic affairs (2004-2006) and chair of the marketing group (2004-2006 and 2008-2011). While at the Haas School, he won numerous awards, including the Williamson Award, named for the UC Berkeley faculty member Oliver E. Williamson, the 2009 Nobel Laureate in Economic Sciences. The award is the Haas School’s highest faculty award, and celebrates honorees who best reflect the character and integrity associated with Williamson’s scholarly work and legacy. Ho has also won the Berkeley Distinguished Teaching Award and three Earl F. Cheit Awards for Excellence in Teaching.

From 1997 to 2002, Ho was associate professor of marketing at the Wharton School. Prior to his time at the Wharton School, he was assistant professor of operations and technology management at the UCLA Anderson School of Management.

Ho's research interests include behavioral game theory and alternatives to equilibrium models, behavioral change in the field, and data-driven decision sciences.

Ho was the first non-US citizen to be editor-in-chief of Management Science, from 1 July 2014 to 31 December 2017. He is a member of the boards of the National University Health System, the Defence Science and Technology Agency, the Government Technology Agency, and DSO National Laboratories. He is also president of the Academy of Engineering, Singapore, an academician of Academia Sinica, and a fellow of the Civil Service College Singapore.

Selected papers
 Camerer C., Dreber A., Holzmeister F., Ho T-H., Huber J., Johannesson M., Kirchler M., Nave G., Nosek B., Pfeiffer T., Altmejd A., Buttrick N., Chan T., Chen Y., Forsell E., Gampa A., Heikensten E., Hummer L., Imai T., Isaksson S., Manfredi D., Rose J., Wagenmakers E-J., Wu H., “Evaluating the Replicability of Social Science Experiments in Science & Nature between 2010 and 2015“, Nature Human Behaviour 2: 627-644, 2018 (published online on 27 August 2018).
 Camerer, C., Dreber, A., Forsell, E., Ho, T-H., Huber, J., Johannesson, M., Kirchler, M., Almenberg, J., Altmejd, A., Chan, T., Heikensten, E., Holzmeister, F., Imai, T., Isaksson, S., Nave, G., Pfeiffer, T., Razen, M., Wu, H. “Evaluating replicability of laboratory experiments in Economics”, Science 10.1126/science.aaf0918, 2016.
 Ho, T-H. and Zhang, J-J., “Designing Pricing Contracts for Boundedly Rational Customers: Does the Framing of the Fixed Fee Matter?”, Management Science 54(4): 686-700, 2008. 
 Ho, T-H., Lim, N. and Camerer, C., “Modeling the Psychology of Consumer and Firm Behavior with Behavioral Economics”, Journal of Marketing Research 43(3): 307-331, 2006.
 Camerer, C., Ho, T-H. and Chong J-K., “A Cognitive Hierarchy Model of Games”, Quarterly Journal of Economics 119(3): 861-898, 2004. 
 Camerer, C. and Ho, T-H., “Experience-weighted Attraction Learning in Normal Form Games”, Econometrica 67(4): 827-874, 1999. 
 Ho, T-H., Camerer, C. and Weigelt, K., “Iterated Dominance and Iterated Best Response in Experimental p-Beauty Contests”, The American Economic Review 88(4): 947-969, 1998.

References

External links

Personal Website
Profile at the National University of Singapore

1961 births
Living people
Singaporean people of Chinese descent
Wharton School of the University of Pennsylvania alumni
Haas School of Business faculty
UCLA Anderson School of Management faculty
University of Pennsylvania faculty
National University of Singapore alumni